Saperda mutica is a species of beetle in the family Cerambycidae. It was described by Thomas Say in 1824. It is known from Canada and the United States.

References

mutica
Beetles described in 1824